"My Love" (Korean: 너를 사랑하고 있어; neoleul salanghago iss-eo) is a song recorded by South Korean singer Baekhyun for the soundtrack of the 2020 drama series Dr. Romantic 2. It was released as a digital single on January 7, 2020, by YAMYAM Entertainment, under license by Kakao M.

Chart performance 
"My Love" debuted at number seventeen on South Korea's Gaon Digital Chart for the chart issue dated January 5–11, 2020 rising and reaching number fifteen on the following week, becoming the singer's eighth top 15 single on the chart. The song also reached the twenty-ninth position on the Billboard K-Pop Hot 100.

Track listing

Charts

Weekly charts

Monthly charts

Year-end charts

Awards and nominations

Release history

References 

Baekhyun songs
2020 songs
2020 singles
Korean-language songs